Sokolovo is a rural locality (a village) in Tolshmenskoye Rural Settlement, Totemsky District, Vologda Oblast, Russia. The population was 21 as of 2002.

Geography 
Sokolovo is located 75 km southwest of Totma (the district's administrative centre) by road. Manylovsky Pogost is the nearest rural locality.

References 

Rural localities in Totemsky District